= Maymin =

Surname

Maymin is a surname believed to be derived from the name Maimonides, a Rabbi of the 12th century.

One of the greatest Torah scholars of all time, Maimonidies was a rabbi, physician, and philosopher in Spain, Morocco and Egypt during the Middle Ages. He was the preeminent medieval Jewish philosopher whose ideas also influenced the non-Jewish world.

== External source ==
- - Maymin family history web-site
- - Phil Maymin for US Congress in the Fourth Congressional District of CT.
- - Allan Maymin
- - Dan Maymin
